Walk Between Worlds is the eighteenth studio album by Scottish rock band Simple Minds, released in February 2018 by BMG.

Background

Walk Between Worlds heralded major lineup changes for Simple Minds. After a period of relative stability since the early 2000s, only vocalist Jim Kerr, guitarist Charlie Burchill and bassist Ged Grimes remained from the previous studio album, Big Music.

It was the first album since 2002's Cry without keyboardist Andy Gillespie, who left the band in early 2017. Longtime drummer Mel Gaynor performed on nine of the album's tracks, but left prior to the band's 2018 tour.

Longtime associate Gordon Goudie played acoustic guitar on four songs. Goudie also appeared on the following Simple Minds albums: 2001's Neon Lights, 2002's Cry, 2005's Black & White 050505, 2009's Graffiti Soul, 2016's Acoustic and 2017's Acoustic in Concert. Sarah Brown remains the primary backing vocalist of the band.

Percussionist Cherisse Osei played on three songs and is the official drummer for the 2018 tour. Catherine AD aka The Anchoress provided backing vocals on two songs and was playing keyboards on tour but abruptly left the band during the 2018 tour.

Also returning on the album was Peter-John Vettese, who played piano on two tracks and arranged string orchestra on one song. (Vettese also appeared on the album Real Life in 1991).

Walk Between Worlds was performed in its entirety in February 2018 during seven concerts throughout Europe.

Artwork
The album artwork is by Brazilian visual artist Heitor Magno.

Critical reception
Walk Between Worlds received generally positive reviews from music critics. On the review aggregator website Metacritic, which assigns a "Metascore" based on the ratings and reviews of selected mainstream independent publications, the album has a weighted average score of 70 out of 100 based on 9 reviews, indicating "generally favorable reviews". Writing in Uncut Magazine, Graeme Thompson described it as, "an expansive, atmospheric reboot of the muscular melancholy of 1985's Once Upon a Time, and "as strangely compelling as anything they've done over the past 35 years."

On 28 January 2018, a few days before its release, Walk Between Worlds was awarded "Album of the Week" by The Times.

Track listing
All tracks written by Jim Kerr and Charlie Burchill except where noted.

Standard edition
 "Magic" – 4:35
 "Summer" – 4:57 (Kerr, Burchill, Owen Parker)
 "Utopia" – 4:15
 "The Signal and the Noise" – 5:18 
 "In Dreams" – 4:16
 "Barrowland Star" – 6:23
 "Walk Between Worlds" – 5:13
 "Sense of Discovery" – 6:27 (Kerr, Burchill, Parker)

Deluxe edition bonus tracks
"Silent Kiss" – 4:57
 "Angel Underneath My Skin" – 3:43 (Mark Kerr / Erikah Karst)
 "Dirty Old Town" (live) – 4:53 (Ewan McColl)

B-sides
 "Direction of the Heart" – 4:23 (B-side of the Magic 7" vinyl single)

Durations:
 50:02 with the first 2 (studio) bonus tracks 
 54:55 with the 3 bonus tracks

Personnel
Simple Minds
 Jim Kerr – lead vocals
 Charlie Burchill – guitars, keyboards, programming, music composition
 Ged Grimes – bass guitar
 Mel Gaynor – drums, percussion (on "Walk Between Worlds")
with:
 Cherisse Osei – drums (on "Sense Of Discovery"), percussion (on "Sense Of Discovery" and "Dirty Old Town")
 Sarah Brown – additional lead vocals (on "In Dreams"), backing vocals (on "Magic", "The Signal and the Noise", "Barrowland Star", "Walk Between Worlds", "Sense of Discovery", "Angel Underneath My Skin" and "Dirty Old Town")
 Gordy Goudie – acoustic guitar (on "Summer", "Utopia", "Barrowland Star" and "Dirty Old Town")
 Catherine AD aka The Anchoress – backing vocals (on "Utopia" and "Angel Underneath My Skin")
 Peter-John Vettese – piano and string arrangements (on "Barrowland Star")
 Owen Parker – keyboards, programming, music composition (on "Summer" and "Sense Of Discovery")
 Andy Wright – backing vocals (on "Summer", "Sense Of Discovery" and "Angel Underneath My Skin"), production (on all songs)
 Hatty Parker and Emily Parker – additional backing vocals (on "Sense of Discovery")

Charts

Weekly charts

Year-end charts

About the tracks
Source

 After initially appearing as an idea of a melody during the recording sessions for Good News from the Next World (1995) and later being recorded for Black & White 050505 (2005) as "Fortune Teller", the song was then considered for Graffiti Soul (2009) but, again, not released until it was finally rerecorded (and retitled) as "Magic" for Walk Between Worlds. It was (probably erroneously) premiered on 15 December 2017 on RTL radio in France.

 "Summer" was first mentioned in June 2010 by Jim Kerr as a possible track for his second Lostboy! album.

 "Utopia" was first mentioned by Jim Kerr in June 2012. Simple Minds were initially considering recording and releasing two separate albums simultaneously. The first album would have been named after this track, Utopia. The second album was going to be called Nostalgia after a track of the same name, "Nostalgia", originally written by Simon Hayward for the second Lostboy! album and recorded at Sphere Recording Studios. This idea was eventually abandoned and the single album Walk Between Worlds was released instead.

 "The Signal and the Noise" (music written by Owen Parker, lyrics written by Jim Kerr, starting in the morning of 17 November 2013) was initially intended for Big Music (2014) as "Signal and the Noise".

 An early instrumental version of the song "Barrowland Star" was originally written and recorded in 1994 and already released in 1995 as "Celtic Strings", the B-side for the single "She's a River".

 "Sense of Discovery" was also first mentioned in June 2010 by Jim Kerr as a possible track for his second Lostboy! album.

 "Silent Kiss" was first mentioned by Jim Kerr (as "A Silent Kiss") and first worked by the band in early January 2016 as a «kind of dark, very romantic» tune «related in style to both "Liaison" and "Bittersweet" from Big Music.»

 "Angel Under My Skin" was originally written by Mark Kerr and Erikah Karst during the Cry period (2002) and later worked on for Black & White 050505 and Graffiti Soul before it was finally recorded and released on Walk Between Worlds.

 Written by Ewan McColl, the modern folk song "Dirty Old Town" was made most famous by The Pogues.

Leftovers and new tracks considered for the album 
Source

 "Chrome Heart" (worked in the studio on 6 April 2012 with Simon Hayward)
 "Fireball" (a song that Steve Eddie introduced to Jim Kerr around 2007/2008)
 "Fire Fighter" (first demoed by Charlie Burchill and Jim Kerr on May 2009) 
 "For One Night Only" (a song written by Kerr / Burchill which didn't make the final album;   one of the most joyous and upbeat tracks from the Walk Between Worlds sessions, the song was always listed as a bonus track along with "Angel Under My Skin" and was originally going to be a free giveaway track when the album was announced; as it was just before Christmas, the song was also remixed to give it a more "Christmassy" spirit; neither version was released)
 "Harmonize" (based on an idea that came out of recordings made in Sicily over a decade prior to April 2012 when it was ultimately rediscovered)
 "Human Trafficking" (written in Hamburg during Summer 2009, first mentioned by Jim Kerr in February 2010, "not to be finished quite yet" as Jim Kerr stated on 25 November 2010) 
 "Love's Bonfire" (idea of the song developed by Jim Kerr during a rest in April 2012 in Taormina, Sicily) 
 "Machines" (written by Simon Hayward)
 "Photograph" (composed by Andy Gillespie; demoed for Big Music)
 "New Light On No Man's Land" (an instrumental recorded during the Walk Between Worlds sessions which was briefly considered for the album's title but was eventually dropped from the album and remained unreleased)
 "Planet Zero" (Jim Kerr (lyrics), Charlie Burchill (music); described by Jim Kerr as «an insanely catchy and thundering "space-rock" track with music written by Charlie Burchill and featuring arguably one of his best ever guitar melodies», a song «that conjures up Prince set to the background of Hawkwind» and «sounds like pure Simple Minds, albeit remade and remodelled»; recording started in late August 2011 during the "Greatest Hits +" Europe Tour and completed in London at the start of September 2011 with Steve Hillage producing)
 "Solstice Kiss" (song first written (by Ged Grimes) during the Big Music sessions and mentioned several times during the recordings; re-recorded at the Sphere Recording Studio; a contender for the next Simple Minds album)
 "Traffic" (unreleased song from the Good News from the Next World sessions worked on by Mark Schulman; unearthed by Charlie Burchill for the Our Secrets Are the Same sessions but it didn't make the grade again; revisited for Black And White 050505 and Big Music but remained unreleased)
 "Tsunami" (Iain Cook (music), Jim Kerr (lyrics); demoed for Big Music; Jim Kerr worked on this new tune on 30 November and 1 December 2010, shortly after having postponed (on 13 November 2010) the Lostboy! AKA Electroset Tour 2010)

Notes

References

External links
Simple Minds at Dream Giver Redux

2018 albums
Simple Minds albums